Microdes diplodonta is a moth in the family Geometridae. It is found in Australia (including Tasmania, the type location).

References

Moths described in 1904
Eupitheciini